Pranab Debbarma (born 21 December 1962) is an Indian politician and member of the Communist Party of India (Marxist). He is the former member of Tripura Legislative Assembly since 1993 to 2018 from Simna (Tripura Vidhan Sabha constituency). In 2018 Tripura Legislative Assembly election he was defeated by IPFT candidate Brishaketu Debbarma.

Early life
Debbarma was born on 21 December 1962 in Ishanpur, Sidhai Tripura, India. He has involved himself in student movement from 1978 to 1988 with the banner of SFI TSU. He completed his graduation from Maharaja Bir Bikram College. After his graduation he joined Youth Organisation to know the actual problems of youths. In 1996, he was kidnapped by All Tripura Tiger Force and he was taken to Bangladesh, he spent 11 months under their strong surveillance.

Political career
He started his political career as a student activist from 1978. Later he joined Tribal Youth Federation a tribal youth wing of CPI(M). In 1993, Tripura Legislative Assembly election he became Member of Legislative Assembly from Simna ST. From 1993 to 2018 he was the MLA of Simna Constituency. He is Member of CPI(M) Tripura state committee and the Central committee member of Ganamukti Parishad.

References

Further link

External links
 Secretary, Sub-division Committee
 CPM heralds change in tribal organisation-The Telegraph

People from West Tripura district
Communist Party of India (Marxist) politicians
Communist Party of India (Marxist) politicians from Tripura
Living people
Tripura politicians
Tripuri people
People from Tripura
1962 births